Ulrich Landvreugd (born 7 November 1971) is a Dutch former footballer who is assistant manager at SC Telstar.

Playing career
Landvreugd began his career in the youth academy at Ajax before joining SC Cambuur in 1992 and then Ipswich Town three years later, though he only played for the reserves there. At the age of 24, he suffered a knee injury that curtailed his professional career. He later played in amateur football for Amsterdamsche FC, ASV De Dijk and AFC '34.

Coaching career
Landvreugd managed ASV De Dijk, SC Voorland, SVW '27 and Blauw-Wit Amsterdam in Dutch amateur football. In October 2012, he joined Barnet as assistant manager to Edgar Davids. After the departure of Davids in January 2014, Landvreugd and first-team coach Dick Schreuder were appointed as joint managers on 23 January. Landvreugd holds a UEFA "A" License. The duo lost their jobs to Martin Allen on 19 March after four straight losses, and returned to a first team coaching role. He left Barnet on 16 April 2014.

References

1971 births
Living people
Footballers from Amsterdam
Dutch footballers
Netherlands youth international footballers
Dutch football managers
Dutch expatriate footballers
Expatriate footballers in England
AFC Ajax players
SC Cambuur players
Ipswich Town F.C. players
Barnet F.C. non-playing staff
Barnet F.C. managers
National League (English football) managers
ASV De Dijk players
Association football midfielders
AFC '34 players
AFC '34 managers
SC Telstar non-playing staff